In software design, model-driven integration is a subset of model-driven architecture (MDA) which focuses purely on solving Application Integration problems using executable Unified Modeling Language (UML).

External links

 "Model-Driven Integration in Financial Services" case-study by Metada, 2008

Systems engineering
Unified Modeling Language